Mount  Grey is a  mountain  west of Amberley in New Zealand. It is named after Sir George Grey who was governor of New Zealand when English surveyors climbed it in 1849. In Te Reo Māori, the mountain is Maukatere, "floating mountain", from where the spirits of the dead leave on the long journey to Cape Reinga. 

It is known as the mountain associated with the Kaiapoi-based Ngāi Tūāhuriri hapū of Ngai Tahu. Maukatere marked the inland boundary of the Crown purchase of the Canterbury and Otago area recorded in "Kemp's Deed" in 1848.

In 1998, the settling of the Ngāi Tahu Treaty claim updated the official name of the mountain to Mount Grey / Maukatere.

References

Grey
Hurunui District